The Copa del Sol was an annual exhibition international club football tournament played on the south coast of Spain in January–February, one month before the kickoff of the national leagues, that ran from 2010 to 2014.
 
The tournament was a chance for training and match play for the northern European football teams during their winter break against big names from Eastern European football, particularly Russia and Ukraine. It was co-organized by Swedish IEC in Sports, part of Lagardère Group and Norwegian Norsk Toppfotball. All games were broadcast back to home markets of participating clubs allowing fans to observe the current progress of team preparation for the upcoming season, and were screened live on television in Sweden, Norway, Denmark and pan-Africa.

History
With the inaugural tournament mainly held at Marbella FC's 7500-capacity Estadio Municipal, the final game of the 2010 tournament could not be held due to heavy rain. Both of the teams reaching the final, Shakhtar Donetsk and CSKA Moscow were declared joint winners. The highest-scoring game in competition history came in its opening year, with Kalmar beating Ole Gunnar Solskjaer's Molde 6–4. Despite being organised as a warm-weather training tournament, fans from across Scandinavia did travel to watch the matches, with some attendances reaching 1,000.

With the tournament moving to La Manga and Elche and expanded to 16 teams, FC Karpaty Lviv were the winners of the 2011 tournament. To replace the Copa del Sol in its former host city, the Marbella Cup was relaunched after an absence of seven years.

The 2012 tournament took place from 28 January to 7 February, and was won by Spartak Moscow.

The 2013 tournament took place on 23 January - 2 February 2013. FC Shakhtar Donetsk beat Widzew Lodz 2–1 in the final. The total amount of prize money was 80,000 euro.

Strømsgodset IF of Norway won the last Copa del Sol tournament in 2014, beating Astra Giurgiu in the final, becoming the first (and last) Scandinavian club to win the competition. Only AIK represented Sweden, with Vestsjælland being the lone Danish club attached. No club from Russia or Ukraine competed, and sides from Latvia, Moldova and Angola were brought in. Setanta Africa, who had broadcast the previous four tournaments, did not cover the 2014 edition.

With interest waning, the absence of Champions League and Europa League sides, and with most matches watched by only a handful of spectators at the now-permanent venue of La Manga, the competition was discontinued.

A rival event, the La Manga Cup, ran from 1999 until 2016, but also suffered a similar ultimate fate when many top Scandinavian clubs chose not to take part in what turned out to be its final year.

Results

See also
Football Impact Cup
Marbella Cup
Costa del Sol Trophy

References